Elena Nathanael (Greek: Έλενα Ναθαναήλ, January 19, 1947 – March 4, 2008) was a Greek film actress.

Biography

Early life
Elena Nathanael was born Eleni Delivassili-Nathanael, in Nea Filadelfeia, Athens, to a well-off family. Delivassili was her father's surname and Nathanael was her mother's one, but she had kept both of them, although she was credited and became famous as Nathanael. Her father was a textile designer and manufacturer, an Asia Minor Greek from Aivali, while her mother was a Maniot. She studied drama at the Pelos Katselis Drama School.

Career
Her impressively good looks got her noticed in the 1960s by producers and directors of the then-flourishing Greek cinema. She first appeared at the cinema, in the movie  in 1964, directed by Giannis Dalianidis. Her second screen role was in 1965, in the German movie The Blood of the Walsungs, directed by Rolf Thiele and based on a Thomas Mann novel. A few more parts followed in Greek movies of the late sixties and in most of her roles she was featured as a spoilt rich girl.

In 1968 she got the "Best Actress Award" in the International Thessaloniki Film Festival for her role in the movie . In the early 1970s she established her screen persona as a free-spirited, beautiful young woman and became a fashion icon. The abrupt decline of the Greek commercial cinema during that decade had an unpleasant impact on her career which was something usual for the Greek film stars of the period.

After a seven-year absence she made a comeback with a number of straight-to-video movies, usually light comedies. After that she faded away and she made only some special appearances. One of her roles worthy of her beauty and acting abilities was that of "Julia" in the hugely successful soap opera, in 1998. Her last appearance was the role of "Maya Hoover" in the popular TV series aired on Mega Channel, Gorgones, in 2007, and her return was warmly received by the audience .

Personal life
Elena Nathanael had a relationship with Giorgos Tsagkaris, with whom gave birth to her daughter named Inka, in 1973. After her retirement, she had been living for several years at her farm in Euboea, with her life partner Tasos Mitropoulos, a veteran footballer of Olympiacos, where she had taken up wine production. She died from lung cancer on March 4, 2008, and the Greek press referred to her as the "Enchantress of the Greek cinema". Her funeral took place on March 5, in the cemetery of Nea Filadelfeia, where a lot of people took leave of her.

Filmography

References

External links

1947 births
2008 deaths
Greek film actresses
Greek stage actresses
Actresses from Athens
Deaths from lung cancer in Greece